Ride Like a Girl is a 2019 Australian biographical sports drama film directed by Rachel Griffiths in her feature film directing debut and starring Teresa Palmer and Sam Neill. It is based on the true story of Michelle Payne, the first female jockey to win the Melbourne Cup in 2015.

The film is book-ended with documentary footage, which shows at the start Payne as a small girl saying she wants to win the Melbourne Cup and at the end, as a young woman, winning the 'race that stops a nation'. In her memorable victory speech, which was televised live across Australia, she told all the people along the way who had said she couldn't do it, to “get stuffed”. Griffiths watched the speech at a Cup day barbecue and was inspired to make the film.

Plot

Teresa Palmer plays Michelle Payne, the youngest of ten children of racehorse trainer Paddy Payne, who dreams of becoming a jockey and becomes the first woman to win the Melbourne Cup in 2015.

Cast
Teresa Palmer as Michelle Payne
 Summer North as Young Michelle Payne
Sam Neill as Paddy Payne
Stevie Payne as himself
Genevieve Morris as Joan Sadler
Brooke Satchwell as Therese Payne
Sullivan Stapleton as Darren Weir
Magda Szubanski as Sister Dominique
Anne Phelan as Sister Mary
Zara Zoe as Maree Payne
Sophia Forrest as Cathy Payne
Shane Bourne as Trevor Smart
Dawn Brennan as Wedding Extra
Karen Brennan as Wedding Extra
Benjamin Bartlett as Wedding Extra
Mick Molloy as Bairdy
Annaliese Apps as Brigid Payne

Release
Ride Like a Girl was released in Australia on September 26, 2019 and was distributed worldwide by Paramount Home Video on March 10, 2020.

Reception
The website's critics consensus reads: "Ride Like a Girl is far from the subtlest inspirational drama, but its fact-based story and charming cast are just enough to guide it down the stretch." On Metacritic, the film has a weighted average score of 47 out of 100, based on 6 critics, indicating "mixed or average reviews".

Accolades

References

External links
 
 

2019 films
Australian biographical drama films
Australian horse racing films
Australian sports drama films
Films about horses
2019 biographical drama films
2010s sports drama films
Films directed by Rachel Griffiths
Films scored by David Hirschfelder
Films set in the 20th century
Films set in the 21st century
Films set in 1991
Films set in 2015
Melbourne Cup
2019 directorial debut films
Films about women's sports
Films set in Melbourne
Films set in Victoria (Australia)
2010s English-language films
Screen Australia films